Sturm & Drang Tour 2002 is a KMFDM album recorded live during the Sturm and Drang Tour in 2002. It was compiled from the Cleveland, Detroit and Chicago shows. It includes some of the tracks from the Attak album, along with some songs from other albums. The tour featured 16 Volt, Kidneythieves, and PIG as supporting acts. KMFDM's lineup consisted of:

Track listing

Personnel
Sascha Konietzko – vocals, percussion, samplers, synthesizers
Raymond Watts – vocals, guitars
Lucia Cifarelli – vocals, ninja-sidstation
Bill Rieflin – bass
Jules Hodgson – guitars
Andy Selway – drums
Steve White – guitars

External links
 [ Sturm & Drang Tour 2002 Overview] at Allmusic

KMFDM live albums
2002 live albums